This is a list of cities, towns, and other inhabited places in the 10 districts of the island country of Saint Lucia. There are 150 inhabited places in Saint Lucia. The significant cities and the district where they are located are listed below.

Cities
The following are the significant cities in Saint Lucia:

See also
 Districts of Saint Lucia

References

Saint Lucia, List of cities in
Cities
Cities